The Mount, Mill Hill International is a coeducational independent day and boarding school located in Mill Hill, North London and forms part of the Mill Hill School Foundation, close to the main Mill Hill School site.

Boarding houses are shared with Mill Hill pupils, and the international pupils have full use of the Senior School’s facilities.

Until July 2014, the Mount School was an independent GSA day school for girls aged 3–16. It had been founded with 10 pupils in 1925 by Mary McGregor in North Grove, Highgate Village. The number of pupils increased gradually and in 1935 it relocated to Mill Hill.

In December 2013 The Mount merged with the Mill Hill School Foundation. A £4,000,000 renovation project involved the complete refurbishment of all classrooms, the re-landscaping of the grounds, the updating of the science facilities and a new IT and food technology suite.

Heads 
1925: Mary McGregor
1963: Betty Shannon Millin
1973: Margaret Pond
1998: Mrs J Kirsten Jackson
2008: Ms Catherine Cozens
2015: Ms Sarah Bellotti

Alumni 
Famous alumni include singer Amy Winehouse and actress Daisy Edgar-Jones.

References

Educational institutions established in 1925
1925 establishments in England
Defunct schools in the London Borough of Barnet
Educational institutions disestablished in 2013
2013 disestablishments in England